Vice Admiral Ronald Alvin Edwards  (1923–2014) was a South African military commander.

Military career 
He joined the Union Defence Force in 1940 and served in 2 Anti Aircraft Artillery Brigade. In 1946 he was appointed CO of 8 Coastal Artillery, after which he served in the South Africa Marine Corps on Robben Island before transferring to the South African Navy in 1950. He was Officer Commanding of the Naval Provost Unit from April 1959 to December 1960

He served as Chief of Staff Personnel from 1 October 1977 to 31 January 1980 before becoming Chief of the Navy from 1 February 1980 to 30 September 1982.

Awards and decorations

References

See also
 List of South African military chiefs
 South African Navy

South African admirals
1923 births
Chiefs of the South African Navy
South African military personnel of World War II
2014 deaths
People from Paarl